XHEM-FM (103.5 MHz) is a Mexican radio station licensed to Ciudad Juárez. The station broadcasts the La Z grupera/Regional Mexican format.

History

Emmy Pinto Reyes, also the original owner of XHPR-FM in Veracruz, Veracruz, received the concession for XHEM in 1970.

Until 2015, XHEM carried the Planeta Spanish CHR format; La Z, which had been on XHNZ-FM 107.5, moved here after Grupo Radio México, a predecessor to Grupo Radio Centro outside Mexico City, stopped operating that station.

References

External links
 
 

Radio stations in Chihuahua
Radio stations established in 1970
Mass media in Ciudad Juárez
1970 establishments in Mexico
Grupo Radio Centro